The January 2021 NBA G League draft was the 20th draft of the NBA G League. The draft, originally scheduled to be held in October 2020 prior to the 2020–21 G League season, was postponed until January 11, 2021 due to concerns caused by the COVID-19 pandemic. The 2020–21 season was also delayed, instead starting in February 2021.

Admiral Schofield was selected by the Greensboro Swarm with the first overall pick. The draft lasted three rounds and was limited to only the 17 teams who were going to be playing in the "G League Bubble" in Orlando, Florida.

Key

Draft

First round

Second round

Third round

*Cannot make pick

References

Draft
Nba G League draft
NBA G League draft
National Basketball Association lists
NBA G League draft